The Beehive Boot, which signifies instate football supremacy among Division I FBS universities from the state of Utah, began in the 1971 NCAA University Division football season. The authentic pioneer boot, which is estimated to be well over 100 years old, is typically awarded annually to the Utah school with the best record against its instate NCAA Division I FBS foes. The schools that compete for the boot are Brigham Young, Utah, and Utah State. Weber State was originally eligible to win the trophy and games against them counted towards their opponents' record when determining the winner of the trophy. It is unclear when this stopped being the case, but it was at least by 2012, when Utah State won the trophy over BYU (BYU's win over Weber State was not counted towards their instate record).

In the case of three-way ties between the schools, the winner was chosen by vote of the in-state media. Such an event has happened four times previously: in 1973, 1997, 2010, and in 2012. Utah State was awarded the trophy in each year. The 2017 season also ended with a tie where both Utah and Utah State defeated BYU, but did not play each other. However, no winner was officially awarded the Beehive Boot.

In addition to the Beehive Boot, BYU and Utah State also play for The Old Wagon Wheel. The same three universities, along with Weber State University, Southern Utah University, and Utah Valley University, also played for a statewide trophy in basketball called the Old Oquirrh Bucket until the 2010 season, when it was retired due to conference realignments. Along with the Florida Cup, Commander-in-Chief's Trophy and the Michigan MAC Trophy, the Beehive Boot is one of the few three-way FBS rivalries that presents a trophy to the winner.

History
Brigham Young has the most wins in the series with 23, followed by Utah with 15, and Utah State with 9. After residing in Logan on USU's campus for the first four years of its existence, the trophy spent most of the next two decades in the hands of BYU. The Cougars won the intrastate series 19 of the next 27 years, including five in a row from 1983 to 1987. Since the mid-1990s, the boot has been back and forth between Salt Lake and Provo many times. Utah had a brief period of success during the early part of this century, winning four straight Beehive Boots from 2002 to 2005. It has also made a couple of trips to Logan during the past couple of decades.

Historically, the trophy goes to the winner of the BYU-Utah game. Only nine times has that not happened: the years when Utah State has won it. Only four times in history has the winner of the Beehive Boot lost an intrastate game (Utah State in 1973, 1982, 1997, 2012).

Utah won the trophy in 2016 after being the only team with an unbeaten in-state record, but the trophy then stopped being awarded. In 2021, BYU defeated both Utah and Utah State, leading to having a de facto winner for the first time since 2016. BYU then inquired as to the whereabouts of the trophy, resulting with BYU claiming the trophy two weeks later after it was found by Utah.

The Holy War

The "Holy War" is one of America's oldest and most heated college football rivalries. In fact, the schools even differ on when the first game was played. Utah claims that the first game was played in 1896 (when Brigham Young University was known as Brigham Young Academy). BYU on the other hand claims that the rivalry dates back to 1922, the first year BYU began playing football. For historical purposes, 1922 is the date most used when referring to the start of the Holy War. The Utes lead the all-time series 60–35–4. The Cougars are 27–20 since the Beehive Boot was created in 1971.

The Old Wagon Wheel

BYU and Utah State have met for the Old Wagon Wheel 88 times, dating back to 1922, with BYU holding a 48–37–3 lead. BYU had beaten Utah State ten straight times before Utah State defeated BYU by the score of 31–16 on October 1, 2010.  With the victory, Utah State reclaimed the Old Wagon Wheel for the first time since 1993, and subsequently took the trophy in 2014, 2017, and 2018.

The Battle of the Brothers

The Utah/USU rivalry, often called the Battle of the Brothers, is the most played rivalry between any of the schools that participate in the Beehive Boot series, with 112 total all-time meetings. Utah leads the series 79–29–4, and Utah has won 22 victories in the last 25 meetings. The first game was played in 1892, a 12-0 Aggie victory, and the Utes and Aggies had met every year from 1944 to 2009 before taking a break. The Utes have won 31 of 42 meetings since the Boot was first awarded, with 5 of USU's 11 victories coming in the first 6 years after the trophy's creation.

Winners of the trophy and results

Rankings next to a champion's name indicate that team's ranking in the final AP Poll for that season. Teams are unranked unless otherwise indicated. Games against Weber State are included up until 1982, the last year that these games were certain to have counted towards each teams' interstate record.  Between 2016 and 2020, there were no announced winners and it was kept by Utah.

See also 
 List of NCAA college football rivalry games
 List of most-played college football series in NCAA Division I
 Old Oquirrh Bucket similar historic trophy for Basketball, that includes additional Utah schools.

References

College football rivalry trophies in the United States
BYU Cougars football
Utah State Aggies football
Utah Utes football